Luis Zubero (born 18 March 1948) is a Spanish former cyclist. He competed in the individual road race at the 1968 Summer Olympics.

References

External links
 

1948 births
Living people
People from Arratia-Nerbioi
Spanish male cyclists
Olympic cyclists of Spain
Cyclists from the Basque Country (autonomous community)
Cyclists at the 1968 Summer Olympics
Sportspeople from Biscay